This is a list of schools in the London Borough of Harrow, England.

State-funded schools

Primary schools

Avanti House Primary School
Aylward Primary School
Belmont School
Camrose Primary School
Cannon Lane Primary School
Cedars Manor School
Earlsmead Primary School
Elmgrove Primary School
Glebe Primary School
Grange Primary School
Grimsdyke School
Heathland School
Hujjat Primary School
Kenmore Park Infant School
Kenmore Park Junior School
Krishna Avanti Primary School
Longfield Primary School
Marlborough Primary School
Newton Farm Infant and Junior School
Norbury School
Pinner Park Primary School
Pinner Wood School
Priestmead Primary School and Nursery
Roxbourne Primary School
Roxeth Primary School
St Anselm's RC Primary School
St Bernadette's RC Primary School
St George's Primary RC Academy
St Jerome CE Bilingual School
St John Fisher RC Primary School
St John's CE School
St Joseph's RC Primary School
St Teresa's RC Primary School
Stag Lane Primary School
Stanburn Primary School
Vaughan Primary School
Weald Rise Primary School
The Welldon Park Academy
West Lodge Primary School
Whitchurch Primary School
Whitefriars School

Secondary schools

Avanti House Secondary School
Bentley Wood High School	
Canons High School	
Harrow High School		
Hatch End High School		
Nower Hill High School	
Park High School
Pinner High School	
Rooks Heath School
Sacred Heart Language College
St Gregory's RC Science College*	
Salvatorian College
Whitefriars School			
Whitmore High School

* This school is located in Harrow but also accepts pupils from Brent

Special and alternative schools
Alexandra School
The Helix Education Centre
The Jubilee Academy
Kingsley High School
Shaftesbury High School
Woodlands School

Further education
Harrow College
St Dominic's Sixth Form College
Stanmore College

Independent schools

Primary and preparatory schools
Alpha Preparatory School
Buckingham Preparatory School
Harmony Primary School
Orley Farm School
Reddiford School
Roxeth Mead School

Senior and all-through schools
Harrow Independent College
Harrow School
The John Lyon School
North London Collegiate School
Regent Independent College

Special and alternative schools
Pathways School
The Red Balloon Learner Centre

References

Harrow
Schools in the London Borough of Harrow